Ryan John Battaglia (born 29 June 1992), nicknamed Boof, is an Australian professional baseball player who plays catcher for the Brisbane Bandits of the Australian Baseball League.

Career
Ryan was reassigned from the Bandits 22-man roster for the start of the season, but was called up later in the season due to the injury of Joel Naughton. He made his debut as a defensive substitution on 26 November 2010 against the Sydney Blue Sox, being the youngest player to play for the Bandits. It took until his seventh game before Battaglia got his first hit, going 3–6 against the Canberra Cavalry. Ryan's only other hit that season would be a home run against the Adelaide Bite finishing the season only above Daniel Lamb-Hunt in average, with .143.

He plays for the Pine Hills Lightning in the Greater Brisbane League where he led the league in home runs (with eight) for the 2009–10 season.

Battaglia signed a minor league contract with the Cleveland Indians organization in 2011. He was released prior to the 2015 season.

International career
Battaglia has played for Australian junior teams and, in 2010, starred for the Australia national under-19 baseball team where they finished second in the World AAA Championships. He was awarded the tournament Home Run Award and named as the catcher in the All-Star team.

On 8 October 2019, he was selected at the 2019 WBSC Premier12.

References

External links

1992 births
Living people
Arizona League Indians players
Australian expatriate baseball players in the United States
Australian expatriate baseball players in the Czech Republic
Australian people of Italian descent
Baseball catchers
Baseball players from Brisbane
Brisbane Bandits players
Carolina Mudcats players
Lake County Captains players
Mahoning Valley Scrappers players
2023 World Baseball Classic players